Brookside Village is a city in Brazoria County, Texas, United States. The population of the city was 1,548 at the 2020 U.S. census, up from 1,523 at the 2010 U.S. census. In 2018 its population rebounded to an estimated 1,814, but declined in 2019 to 1,577 according to the American Community Survey. The city of Brookside Village is part of the Houston–The Woodlands–Sugar Land metropolitan statistical area.

Geography

Brookside Village is located along the northern border of Brazoria County at  (29.589465, –95.310145). It is bordered by the city of Pearland on the east, south, and west. To the north in Harris County is the city of Houston.

Demographics

As of the 2020 United States census, there were 1,548 people, 475 households, and 387 families residing in the city.

At the 2012 American Community Survey, the U.S. Census Bureau estimated there were 1,940 people and 692 housing units in the city. The racial makeup of Brookside Village was 46.3% non-Hispanic white, 7.8% Black or African American, 0.3% American Indian or Alaska Native, 1.5% Asian, 1.4% two or more races, and 42.6% Hispanic or Latino of any race. In 2018, Brookside Village had an estimated 1,814 residents. The racial makeup of the city was 49.8% non-Hispanic white, 4.1% Black or African American, 0.4% American Indian or Alaska Native, 0.3% Asian, 0.6% some other race, 1.0% two or more races, and 43.7% Hispanic or Latin American of any race.

The median household income in 2018 was $75,234. The median rent was $1,064 and 85 residents were unemployed at the 2018 census estimates.

At the census of 2000, there were 1,960 people, 655 households, and 535 families residing in the city. The population density was 930.8 people per square mile (358.7/km2). There were 708 housing units at an average density of 336.2 per square mile (129.6/km2). The racial makeup of the city was 74.03% White, 3.11% African American, 0.51% Native American, 0.82% Asian, 20.46% from other races, and 1.07% from two or more races. Hispanic or Latino of any race were 43.62% of the population.

There were 655 households, out of which 32.8% had children under the age of 18 living with them, 66.9% were married couples living together, 9.6% had a female householder with no husband present, and 18.2% were non-families. 13.6% of all households were made up of individuals, and 5.0% had someone living alone who was 65 years of age or older. The average household size was 2.99 and the average family size was 3.22.

In the city, the population was spread out, with 24.9% under the age of 18, 8.8% from 18 to 24, 31.0% from 25 to 44, 22.3% from 45 to 64, and 13.0% who were 65 years of age or older. The median age was 37 years. For every 100 females, there were 117.5 males. For every 100 females age 18 and over, there were 117.3 males.

The median income for a household in the city was $44,650, and the median income for a family was $50,625. Males had a median income of $32,500 versus $27,981 for females. The per capita income for the city was $18,609. About 10.1% of families and 16.1% of the population were below the poverty line, including 20.2% of those under age 18 and 5.6% of those age 65 or over.

Education

Primary and secondary schools
Brookside Village is served by Pearland Independent School District.

One elementary school, E. A. Lawhon Elementary School, is located in Brookside Village. The school serves all of Brookside Village.

Brookside Village pupils continue on to Leon H. Sablatura Middle School and Pearland Junior High School west. Pupils east of Roy Road are zoned to Pearland High School, while pupils west of Roy Road are zoned to Glenda Dawson High School. Prior to fall 2007, when Dawson opened, all of Brookside Village was assigned to Pearland High School. All four middle, junior high, and high schools are in the city of Pearland.

Colleges and universities
The city is served by Alvin Community College.

Public libraries
The Pearland Library, in the city of Pearland, is in close proximity to Brookside Village. The library is a part of the Brazoria County Library System.

References

External links

 Brookside Village article in the Handbook of Texas Online

Cities in Texas
Cities in Brazoria County, Texas
Greater Houston